George Edward Hartley (23 July 1909 – 25 August 1992) was an English cricketer. Hartley was a right-handed batsman who bowled right-arm slow. He was born in Walsden, Yorkshire.

Hartley made a single in the 1935 Minor Counties Championship for Denbighshire against Durham. Later, following World War II, Hartley made his only first-class appearance for the Marylebone Cricket Club against Cambridge University in 1946. In this match, he scored 3 runs in the MCC first-innings, before being dismissed by Barry Trapnell, while in their second-innings he scored the same number of runs and was dismissed by the same bowler.

He died in Guildford, Surrey on 25 August 1992.

References

External links
George Hartley at ESPNcricinfo
George Hartley at CricketArchive

1909 births
1992 deaths
Cricketers from Yorkshire
Denbighshire cricketers
English cricketers
Marylebone Cricket Club cricketers
People from Todmorden